KXSS (1390 kHz) is an AM radio station in Waite Park, Minnesota airing a sports format. The station is owned by Townsquare Media.

The radio station’s transmitter is located in Waite Park, serving the St. Cloud metro area. When it was originally brought online in the early 1980s, the studio for the station was near the transmitter site off Highway 23 on the outskirts of Waite Park. The studios were also used for a once local television station WCMN-LP, 13.
The studios are now on the eastern side of St. Cloud, shared with several sister stations.

Along with network programming, the station carries local sports events as well, such as broadcasts during St. Cloud Rox baseball games.

History
The station has had several call letters in its past. FCC history cards indicate the station was originally to be known as KKCM. From November 24, 1985 through February 22nd, 1988, the station was known as KRAR. It then changed to KZXQ. On June 12, 1989, the station changed to its current call letters, KXSS. The station changed again to KSXX on October 11, 1996, and back to KXSS on December 17, 1996.  The station aired a pop music format during the 1980s known as Kiss.

Previous logos

References

External links

Townsquare Media radio stations
Sports radio stations in the United States
St. Cloud, Minnesota
Stearns County, Minnesota
Radio stations in St. Cloud, Minnesota
Radio stations established in 1982
1982 establishments in Minnesota